La Piste du télégraphe is a 1994 French drama film directed by Liliane de Kermadec. A 1927 period road movie with minimal episodic plot, the film follows Russian-born Lisa Alling played by Elena Safonova on foot from New York towards her homeland Siberia, and her encounter with John played by Christopher Chaplin. The film has music by French composer Antoine Duhamel.

Cast 
 Elena Safonova as Lisa Alling
 Christopher Chaplin as John
  as Mike
 Mylène Demongeot as Muriel
 Miki Manojlović as Carlo
 Cong Shan as Shan
 Sergueï Chnyrev as the journalist
 Jean-Yves Gautier as the pilot
 Rémy Roubakha as Billy
 Alexandre Lekov as the vagabond
 Wladimir Tsarev as Harvey
 Alexei Rodionov as Alastair
 Alexandre Kalinski as David
 Ala Boudniskaïa as John's mother
 Alexandre Bilavski as John's father
 Olga Tchernov as Louise
 Ludmilla Korik as Angela
 Serguei Stegalov as Malcolm
 Oleg Banikov as Doug
 Alexandre Mazourienko as Tom
 Boris Bistrov as Scotty
 Oleg Miteen as Michael
 Vladimir Chykov as George

References

External links 

1994 films
1990s French-language films
1994 drama films
Films directed by Liliane de Kermadec
French drama films
Films about hiking
1990s French films